History is the debut EP by Canadian indie rock band controller.controller.  It was released on August 3, 2004 on Paper Bag Records.

Track listing
All songs by controller.controller (Basnayake/Kaija/Llewellyn-Thomas/Morris/Scheven).

 (1.) "..." – 0:40
 (2.) "History" – 4:26
 (3.) "Silent Seven" – 4:17
 (4.) "Sleep Over It" – 3:45
 (5.) "Bruised Broken Beaten" – 2:06
 (6.) "Disco Blackout" – 5:22
 (7.) "Watch" – 4:01

References

2004 albums
2004 EPs
2004 debut EPs
Controller.controller albums
Paper Bag Records EPs